Eilema virgineola is a moth of the  subfamily Arctiinae. It is found in South Africa.

References

Endemic moths of South Africa
Moths described in 1900
virgineola